11th Battalion may refer to:

 11th Battalion (Australia), a unit of the Australian Army
 2/11th Australian Infantry Battalion, a unit of the Australian Army
 11th/28th Battalion, Royal Western Australia Regiment, a unit of the Australian Army
 11th Philippine Scout Battalion, a unit of the Philippine Army
 11th Battalion Ulster Defence Regiment, a unit of the British Army

See also

 11th Army (disambiguation)
 XI Corps (disambiguation)
 11th Division (disambiguation)
 11th Group (disambiguation)
 11th Brigade (disambiguation)
 11th Regiment (disambiguation)
 11 Squadron (disambiguation)